Prosopis abbreviata, commonly known as the algarrobillo espinoso, is a species of flowering plant in the pea family, Fabaceae, that is endemic to Argentina.
It is threatened by habitat loss.

References

abbreviata
Plants described in 1841
Vulnerable plants
Endemic flora of Argentina
Taxonomy articles created by Polbot